Q WORKSHOP is a Polish company located in Poznań that specializes in design
and production of polyhedral dice and dice accessories for use in various games (role-playing games,
board games and tabletop wargames). They also run an online retail store and maintain
an active social media community.

Q WORKSHOP was established in 2001 by Patryk Strzelewicz. Initially,
the company sold its products via online auction services, but in 2005 a website and online store were also
established. Currently there are over 120 designs of dice in stock.

The Q WORKSHOP dice are known for their distinct style and engravings, featuring various motifs such as :
Elven, Dragon, Runic. In 2007 Q WORKSHOP begun production of licensed dice sets, starting with
Call of Cthulhu dice set on license from Chaosium Inc., and following up in 2008 with
Munchkin dice on license from Steve Jackson Games and Pathfinder dice set on license from Paizo Publishing. In 2010, Q WORKSHOP produced a new licensed product based on Pinnacle Entertainment Group's Deadlands role-playing game.

Since then, the company has cooperated with companies like Knight Models, Monte Cook Games or Catalyst Game Labs, to create even more unusual dice designs.

The company offers a custom dice service allowing its clients to design and produce their own unique dice designs, which may then be added to the Q WORKSHOP public catalog.

In 2007 Patryk Strzelewicz was nominated to Entrepreneur of the Year Award hosted by Ernst & Young in the "New Business Category" for his involvement with Q WORKSHOP,
and received a Keep Walking award for young business from Newsweek Polska.

It is the only company from Eastern Europe with membership in GAMA. In 2008 the Official Call of Cthulhu Dice won an Origins Award for "Game Accessory of the Year 2007". A couple of years later, the Metal Steampunk Dice Set has won an Origins Award for Best Gaming Accessory of the Year 2012.

In 2015, the company has released its first Kickstarter campaign, for the Metal Pathfinder Dice Set, together with Paizo. During 30 day campaign, the company has gathered almost $300,000, surpassing its initial goal of $50,000.

Products

Dice Sets

 Classic
 Elven
 Runic
 Dragons
 Nuke and Nuke 3D
 Celtic 3D
 Dwarven
 Steampunk 
 Steampunk Clockwork
 Forest
 Tribal
 Antique Fudge and Cyber Fudge
 Kanji

Battle Dice

 Orcish
 Sniper
 German
 United Kingdom
 Soviet
 USA

Licensed Dice

 Call of Cthulhu Dice
 Deadlands Dice
 Pathfinder Dice
 Legend of the Five Rings
 Warmachine
 Hordes
 Arkham Horror
 Kingsburg
 Numenera
 The Strange
 Cypher System
 The Adventures of the East Mark
 Dragon Age Dice set
 Battletech Dice Set
 Batman & Joker Dice Sets
 Infinity Faction Dice Sets

Dice Accessories

 Dice Cups
 Dice Bags
 Dice Towers

References

External links
Q-workshop Homepage
Comprehensive Display of Q-Workshop Dice

Game manufacturers
Online retailers of Poland
Companies established in 2001
Dice